The 2016 Australian Handball Club Championship was again split into two categories, with the beach championships held on Coolangatta Beach in conjunction with the 2016 Oceania Beach Handball Championship in February   and the indoor held at Geelong, Victoria between June 2–5, 2016 in conjunction with the 2016 Oceania Handball Champions Cup. 

The beach titles, held in glorious sunshine on Queensland's Gold Coast, was dominated by New South Wales teams. In the mixed, it was an all New South Wales final with Maroubra Bluebottles beating Harbourside. The women's had Maroubra Bluebottles also winning against defending champions RUOK? from Queensland. The men's saw Victorian side East Melbourne Spartans beat surprise packet Drop Bears from South Australia.

In the indoor event Seven teams from four states and two countries entered the men's division and five teams from three states entered the women's. For the first time there was also a wheelchair category.

Beach Results

Men's Final

Women's Final

Mixed Final

University Mixed

Results - Men's Indoor

Round Robin - Pool A

Round Robin - Pool B

Fifth-Seventh round robin

Semi Final round robin

Fifth Place Play off

Third Place play off

Final

Final standings - Men

Results - Women's Indoor

Round robin

Third Place play off

Final

Final standings - Women

References

Australian Handball League

See main page 2016 Australian Handball League

External references
 2016 Australian Beach Handball Championships. Change her game. 25 Feb, 2016
 2016 Beach titles. Beach titles report. WHM Magazine pages 64-65.
 Competition details on Handball Australia webpage
 NSW CLUBS TO COMPETE IN AUSTRALIAN CHAMPIONSHIPS. NSWHF webpage. 31 May 2016.
 Geelong ready to host Australian club championships. Handball Australia. 1 June 2016.
 Sydney University aiming to defend title. 2 June 2016.
 Draw on Handball Victoria Webpage
 Day three report. Handball Australia. 4 June 2016. 

Handball competitions in Australia
Australian Handball Club Championship
Australian Handball Club Championship
Handball Club Championship
Beach handball competitions